Ernst Johann Eitel or alternatively Ernest John Eitel (13 February 1838 – 10 November 1908) was a German-born Protestant who became a notable missionary in China and civil servant in British Hong Kong, where he served as Inspector of Schools from 1879 to 1896.

Early life in Germany
Eitel was born in Württemberg, Germany. Eitel studied initially at the Theological Seminary, Schönthal.  In 1860, he graduated from the University of Tübingen with Master of Arts (and  Doctor of Philosophy in 1871).  He was appointed vicar of the state Evangelical-Lutheran Church at Mossingen for the next 12 months.

Canton and Hong Kong
Adopting the Chinese name 歐德理, he came to Lilang, Xin'an district in Guangdong, China under the Basel Mission. Facing refusal of permission to marry an ex-Catholic, he transferred to the London Missionary Society at Canton in April 1865 and took charge of the Boluo Mission and the Hakka villages outside Canton.  The next year, he married Mary Anne Winifred Eaton of the Female Education Society and Lady Superintendent of the Diocesan Native Female Training School.

In January 1870 he moved to Hong Kong while still having charge of the Boluo Mission. In 1875, he became Director of Chinese Studies.  In 1878, he was appointed Supervisor of Interpreters and Translator to the Supreme Court though he resigned this post in 1882 after censure for accepting private payment for translation work he was required to do anyway.  He had resigned from the London Missionary Society in April 1879.

From March 1879 to 1896, Eitel served as Inspector of Schools of the Hong Kong Government.  He was particularly vigorous in promoting education for girls and pursued a policy of private education over government-run schooling.  He also served as Private Secretary to Governor Sir John Pope Hennessy for about two years from 1880 to 1881, again resigning under a cloud, the Governor accusing him of having exceeded his authority.

Eitel left Hong Kong in 1896 to begin a new life as Pastor of St Stephen's Lutheran Church, Pirie Street, Adelaide, South Australia, in 1897.  The next year, he was appointed part-time lecturer in German at the University of Adelaide, a post he held until he died.

A Cantonese Dictionary
Eitel published his Cantonese dictionary, Chinese Dictionary in the Cantonese Dialect in 1877.  This expanded the work of James Legge on the Kangxi Dictionary.

Eitel used his own system of Cantonese Romanization which was a minor refinement of the work of Elijah Bridgman in his pioneering 'Chinese Chrestomathy in the Canton Dialect' of 1841 and Samuel Williams' glossary dictionary Tonic Dictionary of the Chinese Language in the Canton Dialect written in 1856.  His publication was intended to standardize the pronunciation of Cantonese by students in Hong Kong.

His work was criticised by Wong Shik-ling in his book A Chinese Syllabary Pronounced according to the Dialect of Canton on the basis that it inherited inaccuracies from former works.

Publications

References

External links

 Bibliography
 Chinese Dictionaries
 

German Lutheran missionaries
German lexicographers
Lutheran missionaries in China
German expatriates in China
Linguists from Germany
1838 births
1908 deaths
Cantonese language
German male non-fiction writers
Hong Kong civil servants
Historians of Hong Kong
19th-century Lutherans
Missionary linguists
19th-century lexicographers